Rafael Sabino dos Santos (born 17 June 1996), known as Rafael Sabino or just Sabino, is a Brazilian footballer who plays as a midfielder for FC Akzhayik.

Club career
He made his Ukrainian Premier League debut for FC Lviv on 22 July 2018 in a game against FC Arsenal Kyiv.

References

External links
 

1996 births
Footballers from São Paulo
Living people
Brazilian footballers
Association football midfielders
Campeonato Brasileiro Série D players
Grêmio Barueri Futebol players
Grêmio Catanduvense de Futebol players
Ukrainian Premier League players
FC Lviv players
FC Akzhayik players
Brazilian expatriate footballers
Expatriate footballers in Ukraine
Brazilian expatriate sportspeople in Ukraine
Expatriate footballers in Kazakhstan
Brazilian expatriate sportspeople in Kazakhstan